Waja is a town in northern Ethiopia, also known as Waja Temuga.

Waja may refer to:

 Proton Waja, a car model
 Arso Airport (ICAO: WAJA), Indonesia
 WAJA-LP (102.5 FM), a radio station licensed to serve Rocky Mount, North Carolina, United States